Growth regulator may refer to:

 Growth hormone, stimulates growth in humans and other animals
 Insect growth regulator, used as insecticides
 Plant hormone, used to control the growth of weeds